A township is a kind of human settlement or administrative subdivision, with its meaning varying in different countries.

Although the term is occasionally associated with an urban area, that tends to be an exception to the rule. In Australia, Canada, Scotland and parts of the United States, the term refers to settlements too small or scattered to be considered urban.

Australia

The Australian National Dictionary defines township as: "A site reserved for and laid out as a town; such a site at an early stage of its occupation and development; a small town". 

The term refers purely to the settlement; it does not refer to a unit of government. Townships are governed as part of a larger council (such as that of a shire, district or city) or authority.

Canada

In Canada, two kinds of township occur in common use.
In Eastern Canada, a township is one form of the subdivision of a county. Townships are referred to as "lots" in Prince Edward Island; they merely form census subdivisions and are not administrative units. In Canada, a municipality is a city, town, township, county, or regional municipality which has been incorporated by statute by the legislatures of the provinces and territories.
 
In Western Canada, townships exist only for the purpose of land division by the Dominion Land Survey and do not form administrative units. These townships are nominally six miles by six miles (36 square miles, or roughly 93 km2). Townships are designated by their township number and range number. Township 1 is the first north of the First Base Line, and the numbers increase to the north. While not an administrative unit, Alberta and Saskatchewan do have numbered township and range roads in rural areas based on the old Dominion Land Survey. In Saskatchewan and Manitoba, rural municipalities, township-like administrative units below the provincial level, are made up of groups of said surveyed townships.

China

In China, townships are found at the fourth level of the administrative hierarchy, below counties, districts and county level cities; above villages and communities, together with ethnic townships, towns and subdistricts.

India
In India, townships are found at the fourth level of the city.

Jersey
In Jersey, a township is a redundant term, as the only surviving local government level at present are the 12 parishes of the island.

Malaysia

New Zealand
In local government in New Zealand, there are no longer towns or townships. All land is part of either a "city" (mostly urban) or a "district" (mostly rural).  The term "municipality" has become rare in New Zealand since about 1979 and has no legal status.

The term "township" is, however, still in common usage in New Zealand, in reference to a small town or urban community located in a rural area. The expression would generally equate to that of "village" in England.

Pakistan

Philippines
In the Philippines, "townships" referred to administrative divisions established during the American Civil Government in the country. Many of these political divisions were originally established as rancherias during the Spanish Regime. The term was later replaced with "municipal district". Most municipal districts would later be converted into regular municipalities by executive orders from the Philippine president.

Currently, Mambukal, a hill station geographically located in Murcia, Negros Occidental, is the only legally constituted township in the Philippines, created under Republic Act No. 1964, approved June 22, 1957.

In modern days, the term "township" in the Philippines refers to new developments with their own amenities both Vertical and Horizontal projects. The modern and largest townships in the Philippines are New Clark City with 9,450 hectares in Capas of Tarlac, Hamilo Coast with 5,900 hectares in Nasugbu of Batangas, Nuvali with 2,290 hectares in Santa Rosa of Laguna, Lancaster New City with 2,000 hectares in Kawit Imus GenTri of Cavite, Vista City with 1,500 hectares in Las Piñas Muntinlupa of Metro Manila and Dasmariñas of Cavite, Twin Lakes with 1,149 hectares in Tagaytay of Cavite and Alviera with 1,125 hectares in Porac of Pampanga. Majority of the current townships are located near Metro Manila, allowing faster access to the capital region by road and/or rail transport.

Post-Soviet countries

South Africa

In South Africa, under apartheid, the term township (or location), in everyday usage, came to mean a residential development that confined non-whites (Blacks, Coloureds, and Indians) living near or working in white-only communities. Soweto ("SOuth-WEstern TOwnships") and Mdantsane are well-known examples. However, the term township also has a precise legal meaning and is used on land titles in all areas, not only traditionally non-white areas.

Taiwan

In Taiwan, townships are administered by a county, together with county-administered city. There are three types of townships in Taiwan: urban townships, rural townships and mountain indigenous townships. Mountain indigenous townships are those with significant populations of Taiwanese aborigines.

Thailand

United Kingdom

England

In England, the term township is no longer in official use, but the term still has some meaning.

In England, townships referred to subdivisions of large parishes for administrative purposes. This use became obsolete at the end of the 19th century, when local government reform converted many townships that had been subdivisions of ancient parishes into the newer civil parishes in their own right. This formally separated the connection between the ecclesiastical functions of ancient parishes and the civil administrative functions that had been started in the 16th century. Recently, some councils, normally in the north of England, have revived the term.

Scotland

In Scotland, the term is still used for some rural settlements. In parts of the Highlands and Islands, a township is a crofting settlement. In the Highlands generally the term may describe a very small agrarian community.

Wales
For townships in Wales, which were created by an Act of Parliament in 1539 see: Townships in Montgomeryshire.

United States

There are two types of townships in the United States; a state may have one or both types. In states that have both, the boundaries often coincide in many counties.

 A civil township is a widely used unit of local government in the United States, subordinate to a county. Specific responsibilities and the degree of autonomy vary based on each state. In many states, townships are organized and operate under the authority of state statutes, similar to counties. In others, townships operate as municipal corporations—chartered entities with a degree of home rule. There are exceptions, the most notable being New Jersey and Pennsylvania, where townships are a class of incorporation with fixed boundaries and equal standing to a village, town, borough, or city, analogous to a New England town or towns in New York.

 A survey township is a unit of land measure defined by the Public Land Survey System, which in many states has no governmental function at all.

Puerto Rico
When after the Treaty of Paris, the U.S. did its first census of Puerto Rico the documents called them "barrios" as they had been called when Puerto Rico was under Spanish rule.  The townships or barrios as they are called in P.R. and on U.S. Census documents are subdivisions of municipalities of Puerto Rico.

Vietnam
In Vietnam, a commune-level town (thị trấn) is very similar to a township; it is a subdivision of a rural district (huyện) and is the lowest administration subdivision in the country.

Zimbabwe
In Zimbabwe, the term township was used for segregated parts of suburban areas. During colonial years in Rhodesia, the term township referred to a residential area reserved for black citizens within the boundaries of a city or town and is still commonly used colloquially. This reflected the South African usage.

In modern Zimbabwe, the term is also used to refer to a residential area within close proximity of a rural growth point.

See also
 Croft (Scotland)
 Market town
 Shtetl
 Town
 Townland
 Urban-type settlement

References

External links 
 

 
Types of administrative division